The Chronicles of Oklahoma is the scholarly journal published by the Oklahoma Historical Society.  It is a quarterly publication and was first published in 1921.

The Chronicles of Oklahoma includes scholarly articles, book reviews, notes and documents, and the minutes of the quarterly meetings of the OHS Board of Directors.

All members of the Oklahoma Historical Society receive a subscription to The Chronicles of Oklahoma.

References

External links
 Chronicles of Oklahoma Collection at Oklahoma State University

History of the United States journals
History of Oklahoma
Publications established in 1921
Oklahoma Historical Society
1921 establishments in Oklahoma